Mahfuza Akhter Kiron (born 12 February 1967) is a Bangladeshi football administrator and a member of the FIFA Council.

In May 2017, Akhter won the election for the seat on the FIFA Council reserved for Asian women, beating the incumbent Australian Moya Dodd, who had held the seat from 2013–16, by 27 votes to 17.

Akhter was "heavily criticised" following an interview by the BBC World Service, when she struggled to name the current women's world champions, replying "Korea", then "Japan", and then the correct answer, the US.

In March 2019, she was arrested for allegedly defaming the Bangladeshi prime minister, Sheikh Hasina. In a televised interview, Akhter had claimed that the prime minister "maintain[ed] double standard for football and cricket."

References

1967 births
Living people
Bangladeshi football administrators
People of East Pakistan
Women FIFA officials
Women association football executives